The 1982 Iowa gubernatorial election was held on November 2, 1982. Republican nominee Terry Branstad defeated Democratic nominee Roxanne Conlin with 52.81% of the vote.

Primary elections
Primary elections were held on June 8, 1982.

Democratic primary

Candidates
Roxanne Conlin, former United States Attorney for the Southern District of Iowa
Jerome D. Fitzgerald, former State Representative and nominee for Governor in 1978
Edward Campbell, former state Democratic Party chairman

Results

Republican primary

Candidates
Terry Branstad, incumbent Lieutenant Governor

Results

General election

Candidates
Major party candidates
Terry Branstad, Republican
Roxanne Conlin, Democratic

Other candidates
Marcia Farrington, Libertarian
Jim Bittner, Socialist

Results

References

1982
Iowa